The winners of the 13th Vancouver Film Critics Circle Awards, honoring the best in filmmaking in 2012, were announced on January 7, 2013.

Winners and nominees

International

Canadian

References

2012
2012 film awards
Van
2012 in British Columbia